McCoy, McCoys or McCoy's may refer to:

Places

United States
 McCoy, Colorado, an unincorporated town
 McCoy, Indiana, an unincorporated community
 McCoy, Oregon, an unincorporated community
 McCoy, Atascosa County, Texas, an unincorporated community
 McCoy, Kaufman County, Texas, an unincorporated community
 McCoy Mountains, southern California
 McCoy Air Force Base, near Orlando, Florida
 Fort McCoy, Wisconsin, a United States Army base
 Lake McCoy, south of Lake Placid, Florida

Canada
 McCoy Lake, near Port Alberni, British Columbia

Arts and entertainment
 McCoy (TV series), an American series that aired during the 1975–1976 season
 The McCoys, an American 1960s rock band
 McCoy (band), a British heavy metal band

People and fictional characters
 McCoy (surname), including a list of people and fictional characters with the surname
 McCoy McLemore (1942–2009), American National Basketball Association player
 McCoy Tyner (1938–2020), American jazz pianist and composer
 McCoy de Leon, Filipino actor, dancer and model Marc Carlos Francis de Jesus de Leon (born 1995)

Other uses
 McCoy (pottery), American pottery company (1910–1990)
 McCoy's (crisp), a brand of UK crisps (potato chips)
 McCoy Stadium, a minor league baseball stadium in Pawtucket, Rhode Island, United States

See also
 McCoy Center, a large office building in Columbus, Ohio, United States
 McCoy House (disambiguation), various buildings on the United States National Register of Historic Places
 Hatfield–McCoy feud (1878–1891), an American feud
 Fort McCoy, Florida, an unincorporated community
 The Real McCoy (disambiguation)